Dennis Crompton (born in 1935) is an English architect, lecturer and writer on architectural subjects. He was a member of Archigram. He was known as the back-room fixer dealing with technology and looking after the archives of the group.

Early life and education
Crompton was born in Blackpool and studied architecture at Manchester University. The records he kept of Archigram led to the creation of the Archigram Archives, which in turn led to Crompton assembling the Archigram Exhibit.

External links
Architectural Association staff

1935 births
Living people
Architects from Lancashire